Augusto Petró (May 3, 1918 – October 28, 2008) was a Brazilian bishop of the Roman Catholic Church and was one of oldest bishops in the Catholic Church and one of oldest Brazilian bishops.

Petró was born in Santo Antônio da Patrulha, Rio Grande do Sul, and was ordained a priest on November 30, 1944. He was appointed bishop of the  Diocese of Vacaria on May 16, 1958, and ordained a bishop on July 27, 1958. On March 12, 1964, he was appointed bishop of the Diocese of Uruguaiana and remained there until his retirement on July 5, 1995.

He died in a hospital in the Rio Grande do Sul town of Ivoti.

External links
Bio at Catholic Hierarchy

1918 births
2008 deaths
20th-century Roman Catholic bishops in Brazil
Participants in the Second Vatican Council
Roman Catholic bishops of Uruguaiana